Robert Randolph Casey (July 27, 1915 – April 17, 1986) was a member of the United States House of Representatives. He was a Democrat from Texas.

Early life
Casey was born in Joplin, Missouri, but moved to Houston, Texas, as a teenager, attending the city's San Jacinto High School. Casey earned his undergraduate degree from the University of Houston and Juris Doctor from the South Texas College of Law. In 1940, he was admitted to the bar and set up a private practice in Alvin, Texas. Two years later, he became the city attorney.

Political career
In 1943, Casey returned to Houston to become Harris County's assistant district attorney. Casey first ran for office in 1948 when he was able to earn a seat in the Texas House of Representatives, representing the 24th district (Houston). However, he chose not to run for reelection to this post, instead spending the next eight years as Harris County Judge (equivalent to a county executive). He was also an administrator at South Texas College.

Casey was elected to the United States House in 1958 in the newly created 22nd district. He defeated the Republican Thomas Everton Kennerly, Sr. (1903-2000) by 43,660 (61.7%) to 23,317 (33%). 
 (Kennerly subsequently went on to be his party's gubernatorial nominee in 1966 against John B. Connally, Jr.)

Casey was a member of the House Committee on Government Reform and the Committee on the Post Office and the Civil Service. In 1976, he left the House after his appointment to the Federal Maritime Commission by President Gerald R. Ford. He later returned to the practice of law for several years prior to his death.

Casey died in Houston on April 17, 1986.  He is buried at Memorial Oaks Cemetery in Houston.

Memorials
The Bob Casey Federal Courthouse, housing the United States District Court for the Southern District of Texas at 515 Rusk Street in Houston, is named after Bob Casey.

References

External links

1915 births
1986 deaths
Democratic Party members of the Texas House of Representatives
Texas state court judges
Texas lawyers
University of Houston alumni
South Texas College of Law alumni
Politicians from Joplin, Missouri
Federal Maritime Commission members
Politicians from Houston
Democratic Party members of the United States House of Representatives from Texas
20th-century American politicians
20th-century American judges
People from Alvin, Texas
20th-century American lawyers